The 1976 PBA Second Conference Finals was the best-of-5 basketball championship series of the 1976 PBA Second Conference, and the conclusion of the conference's playoffs. The Crispa Redmanizers and Toyota Silver Tamaraws played in the finals for the fifth straight time.

The Crispa Redmanizers won their second championship of the season and third in a row, scoring a similar three games to one series victory against the Toyota Silver Tamaraws.

Qualification

Games summary

Notes

During the championship series, Toyota changed their monicker from the Comets to the Silver Tamaraws but would still wear the Comets uniform used during the conference.

Broadcast notes

References

External links
 Crispa-Toyota rivalry

1976 PBA season
Crispa Redmanizers games
Toyota Super Corollas games
Crispa–Toyota rivalry
PBA Second Conference Finals